Ready, Set, Go! is a software package for desktop publishing. Originally developed for Apple Computer's Macintosh by Manhattan Graphics, it became one of the earliest desktop-publishing packages available for that platform. It was often compared with QuarkXPress and Aldus PageMaker in comparative magazine reviews.

It was later acquired by Diwan and is still available today for the Microsoft Windows platform.

See also
 Adobe InDesign
 Adobe PageMaker
 Quark Xpress

References

External links 
 Ready, Set, Go! page at Diwan

Desktop publishing software
Desktop publishing software for macOS
Desktop publishing software for Windows